Catherine Morris is a British figure skater who competed in ice dance.

With partner Michael Robinson, she won bronze at the 1957 European Figure Skating Championships and silver at the 1958 and 1959 European Figure Skating Championships.

Competitive highlights 
With  Michael Robinson

References 

British female ice dancers
Possibly living people
Year of birth missing